Zug is a city in Switzerland.

Zug or ZUG may also refer to:

People
 Zug (surname), a surname

Places
 Canton of Zug, Switzerland
 Lake Zug (German: Zugersee), a lake in Central Switzerland, situated between Lucerne and Zurich
 Zug, Iran, a village in South Khorasan Province
 Zug Island, in Detroit
 Zug, Western Sahara

Other uses 
 EV Zug, ice hockey team
 Linear progression
 Zug, the German equivalent of a platoon
 Z User Group
 Zug, an evil Sark from the TV show Hot Wheels Battle Force 5
 Zug (Tugs), a fictional character from the 1989 UK children's television series
 Zug 94, football team
 Zug (website), or ZUG, a comedy website that was founded in 1995 by Sir John Hargrave and Genevieve Martineau
 Zug massacre
 Zug Izland